Dameyune Vashon Craig (born April 19, 1974) is an American football coach and former player.  He is currently the Quarterbacks coach at the Texas A&M University.  Craig played professionally as quarterback in the National Football League (NFL) for four seasons with the Carolina Panthers.

Early years

Craig played high school football for Mattie T. Blount High School in Prichard, Alabama, near Mobile. He helped lead his team to two state championships in 1990 and 1992. In 1992 Craig threw for 2,236 yards with 19 tds and he also rushed for 1,250 yards with 14 TDs while helping to lead his team to a second State title

College career
Craig played college football at Auburn University from 1993 to 1997, where he wore jersey number 16.  He was redshirted for the undefeated 1993 season, during Terry Bowden's first year as head coach, then served as the backup quarterback to starter Patrick Nix during 1994 and 1995 (and was MVP of the spring game in 1994 and 1995).  Occasionally during those two seasons he would enter the game at quarterback in place of Nix in goalline situations, where his running ability could be put to good use.

He was named Auburn's starting quarterback for the 1996 and 1997 seasons.  He led Auburn to victory over Army in the Independence Bowl in 1996, while winning the MVP award and setting Auburn offensive team record of 588 total yards in a 62–0 victory over Fresno State. He also prevailed over Clemson University in the Peach Bowl in 1997 where he was also named the MVP. In that ten-win senior season, he also led the Tigers to the SEC Western Division title and a berth in the SEC Championship Game in Atlanta.  Despite a strong performance by Craig, Auburn suffered a narrow loss to Peyton Manning's heavily favored Tennessee Volunteers, 30–29. Craig holds the single season passing record and he was the first QB in Auburn rich QB history to throw for over 3,000 yards

Professional career
Craig's NFL career was spent entirely with the Carolina Panthers, with whom he signed as an undrafted free agent in 1998. Craig played quarterback for Carolina sparingly between 1998 and 2001.

Craig also played in NFL Europe with the Scottish Claymores, where he set a professional American football-record by passing for 611 yards in a game between the Claymores and the Frankfurt Galaxy on May 22, 1999. His jersey from the game hangs in the Pro Football Hall of Fame.

Craig's professional playing career ended after spending the 2002 season with the Indiana Firebirds of the Arena Football League.

Coaching career

Blount High School
Craig entered the coaching ranks with a season as an assistant at his alma mater Blount High School.

LSU
Craig then spent a season as a graduate assistant at Louisiana State University (LSU) with his previous quarterbacks coach at Auburn, Jimbo Fisher, in 2004.

Miami Dolphins
In 2005, he followed LSU head coach Nick Saban to the Miami Dolphins as a special teams assistant coach.

Tuskegee
In 2006, Craig left to become the quarterbacks coach for the Division II Tuskegee University's Golden Tigers. Tuskegee won two Southern Intercollegiate Athletic Conference in Craig's two seasons on staff. They also won the black college football national championship in 2007.

South Alabama
Craig became the wide receivers coach at the University of South Alabama in 2008.

Florida State
Craig became the quarterbacks coach at Florida State University (FSU) in December 2009, again reuniting with Fisher, who had been designated as the head coach starting in January 2010.  Craig was also recruiting coordinator, and was responsible for recruiting future Heisman Trophy winning quarterback Jameis Winston. FSU secured multiple highly ranked recruiting classes during his time there, and he was named 2012 Atlantic Coast Conference (ACC) Recruiter of the Year by both Rivals.com and Scout.com.

Auburn
Craig became the co-offensive coordinator and wide receivers coach at his alma mater after being hired by Auburn University head coach Gus Malzahn in January 2013.

LSU
In February 2016, Craig left Auburn to become the wide receiver's coach for LSU under Les Miles. After Miles was fired during the 2016 season, Craig was fired in February 2017.

Florida State
In the spring of 2017, Craig returned to Florida State to again work for Jimbo Fisher, where he accepted the position of Quality Control of Offense.

Texas A&M
In January 2018, Craig followed Fisher to Texas A&M University to become the wide receivers coach for the Aggies.

References

External links
 Texas A&M profile

1974 births
Living people
American football quarterbacks
Auburn Tigers football players
Carolina Panthers players
Florida State Seminoles football coaches
LSU Tigers football coaches
Ottawa Renegades players
Scottish Claymores players
South Alabama Jaguars football coaches
Texas A&M Aggies football coaches
Tuskegee Golden Tigers football coaches
Washington Redskins players
High school football coaches in Alabama
Sportspeople from Mobile, Alabama
Coaches of American football from Alabama
Players of American football from Alabama
African-American coaches of American football
African-American players of American football
African-American players of Canadian football
20th-century African-American sportspeople
21st-century African-American sportspeople